Goychay is a city, municipality and the capital of the Goychay District of Azerbaijan. The municipality includes the city of Goychay and the nearby village of Qızılqaya.

As of December 2016 the urban population of Goychay was estimated at 42,500, an increase of around 20% since 2004 when the population was recorded as being 35,344.

History 
The settlement dates back to the late 1850s following the devastating 1859 earthquake in Shemakha, though the town was only officially incorporated as such in 1916. Goychay was the administrative center of the Geokchay Uyezd of the Baku Governorate. During the Soviet era, the city was often known by its Russian pronunciation as used in the Russian Empire, Geokchay.

On 2 June 2018 the main bridge carrying the M4 highway across the Goychay River near the city's Olympic Centre was washed away, leading to criminal accusations against several business leaders associated with its construction.

Climate 
Göyçay has a semi-arid climate (Köppen climate classification: BSk).

Notable natives 

 Anvar Mammadkhanli — writer, Honored Art Worker of Azerbaijan SSR.
 Mirza Khazar — prominent radio journalist, essayist, translator of the Bible in Azeri language.
 Rasul Rza — writer, People's Poet of Azerbaijan (1960).
 Rauf Atakishiyev – singer, pianist, People's Artist of Azerbaijan (1967).
 Sadykh bey Aghabekov — general in the Russian Imperial Army, founder and reformer of Azerbaijani Police, Major General, Orientalist.

Twin towns – sister cities

Goychay is twinned with:
 Lida, Belarus
 Valmontone, Italy (2014)

References

External links

Populated places in Goychay District